Palomar is an indie rock band out of Brooklyn, New York.

Profile
The band originally formed in 1998. Rachel Warren is the only original member still in the band, though Rachel and Christina (almost original member) had been in the band Trixie Belden together before Palomar. Sarah and Dale have been in Palomar since making their third record. They have completed national U.S. tours every year since 2003, including a tour shared with nationally-renowned indie bands Mates of State, Spoon, Luna, etc. Their music has heard praise from various magazines including Pitchfork Media and The Austin Chronicle. The blend of rock music and melodic female vocals create a simple and driving pop sound reminiscent of Rilo Kiley. After four albums, two on Brooklyn indie The Self-Starter Foundation, one on Kindercore, and All Things, Forests was released by Misra Records on March 20, 2007. Their name is taken from the Palomar Observatory in San Diego County, California.

Discography

Albums
 Palomar (1999)
 Palomar II  (2002, The Self-Starter Foundation)
 Palomar III: Revenge of Palomar (2004, The Self-Starter Foundation)
 All Things, Forests (2007, Misra Records)
 Sense & Antisense (2012)

EPs
 Palomar 3.5 (2005)

External links 
Palomar official site
Misra Records

Reviews
Pitchfork review of All Things, Forests

Musicians from Brooklyn
Indie rock musical groups from New York (state)
Misra Records artists